The siege of Thessalonica in 254 was the successful defense of the city of Thessalonica by local Roman militia during an invasion of the Balkans by the Goths.

Background
In 254 the Goths invaded and plundered Thrace and Macedonia. In 1979, Herwig Wolfram regarded 254 as the date, while Mallan and Davenport in 2015 suggested 262. Goltz and Hartmann estimated 254 as the date. David Potter in 2016 rejected Mallan and Davenport's estimate and dated it to either 253 or 259.

Siege
The Goths attempted to storm Thessalonica in close order formations and assault columns. The Thessalonicans rallied to defend the city walls and defeated the attacks.

Aftermath
The Goths abandoned the siege and moved on to invade Greece south of Thermopylae, seeking to loot the gold and silver wealth of Greek temples. The siege was recorded by the contemporary historian Dexippus. A fragment of his work, discovered in Vienna in 2010, specifies the involvement of the citizens in the defense.

References

Bibliography

Further reading
Martin, Gunther; Grusková, Jana (2014) "'Dexippus Vindobonensis' (?) Ein neues Handschriftenfragment zum sog. Herulereinfall der Jahre 267/268" 
"The Vienna Dexippus (?) (second revised version)", uploaded by Jones, Christopher

Thessalonica 254
Thessalonica
Thessalonica
Thessalonica
Thessalonica 254
Thessalonica 254
Thessalonica
Military history of Thessaloniki